The Bishop of Wangaratta is the diocesan bishop of the Anglican Diocese of Wangaratta, Australia.

List of Bishops of Wangaratta
References

External links

 – official site

 
Lists of Anglican bishops and archbishops
Anglican bishops of Wangaratta